The vice president of Nepal (Nēpālakā uparāṣṭrapatiharū) is the deputy to the head of state of Nepal. The position was created when the Nepalese monarchy was abolished in May 2008. The current vice-president of Nepal is Ram Sahaya Yadav. The vice president is to be formally addressed as 'His Excellency'.

History 
Under the interim constitution adopted in January 2007, all powers of governance were removed from the King of Nepal, and the Nepalese Constituent Assembly elected in the 2008 Nepalese Constituent Assembly election was to decide in its first meeting whether to continue the monarchy or to declare a republic. On 28 May 2008 the Assembly had voted to abolish the monarchy.

The Fifth Amendment to the Interim Constitution established that the president, vice-president, prime minister and Constituent Assembly chairman and vice-chairman would all be elected on the basis of a "political understanding". However, if one were not forthcoming, they could be elected by a simple majority.

The first election was the 2008 Nepalese presidential election. The parties failed to agree on candidates for president or vice president, so an election took place. Parmananda Jha of the Madhesi Janadhikar Forum was elected with the support of the Nepali Congress and the Communist Party of Nepal (Unified Marxist-Leninist)

List of vice presidents

See also 
 President of Nepal
 List of current vice presidents

References 

Nepal
Government of Nepal
Politics of Nepal
2008 establishments in Nepal
History of Nepal (2008–present)